Peltostigma is a genus of flowering plants belonging to the family Rutaceae.

Its native range is Mexico to Peru, Jamaica.

Species:

Peltostigma guatemalense 
Peltostigma pteleoides

References

Zanthoxyloideae
Zanthoxyloideae genera